Channa Jayasumana is a Sri Lankan medical academic, politician, Cabinet Minister and is a member of the Parliament of Sri Lanka for the Anuradhapura District. He belongs to the Sri Lanka Podujana Peramuna. He studied at the Kalutara Vidyalaya. Channa was a famous athlete in his school days. He holds professional qualifications MBBS from University of Peradeniya, PhD and FRCP Edin. He is a pioneering academic staff member of the Faculty of Medicine and Allied Sciences, Rajarata University of Sri Lanka. Channa joined Rajarata University as a junior lecturer on 2008. He was the professor in pharmacology at the  Rajarata University of Sri Lanka before entered in to politics.

He has done extensive research on drinking water, occupational exposure to pesticides and its association with chronic kidney disease highly prevalent in rural farming communities. Together with his doctoral advisor, Sarath Gunatilake, Prof. Jayasumana was awarded the AAAS Award for Scientific Freedom and Responsibility offered by American Association of Advancement of Science in 2019 for this work, citing "challenging circumstances." He has authored 30 papers in indexed International journals. Channa is an author of the chapter “chronic tubulointerstitial nephritis” in Oxford Text book of Medicine. Prof. Jayasumana is included to the world’s top 2% scientists identified by stanford university in both 2021 and 2022. The list was created by Professor John P. A. Ioannidis from Stanford University and his research team. It contains a publicly available database of 100,000 top scientists that provides standardised information on citations, h-index, co-authorship-adjusted hm-index, citations to papers in different authorship positions, and a composite indicator.

Channa secured 133,980, a recorded number of preferential votes in the Parliamentary election held on August 2020 from the Anuradhapura electoral district and entered in to the 16th parliament of Sri Lanka.

He was appointed state minister of Pharmaceutical Production, Supply and Regulation in 2020.

Following the mass resignation of the Sri Lankan cabinet in the wake of the 2022 Sri Lankan protests, he was appointed as the Minister of Health by President Gotabaya Rajapaksa on 18 April 2022.

Personal life 

Channa is a Buddhist. In 2014 He married Ruwi Jayasumana sales executive of a leading private sector business firm, later turned in to an entrepreneur. They have a son and two daughters. Channa's brother is an Engineer. His twin sisters graduated in accountancy and working in the state sector.

References

Academic staff of the Rajarata University of Sri Lanka
Alumni of the University of Peradeniya
Living people
Members of the 16th Parliament of Sri Lanka
Sinhalese academics
Sinhalese physicians
Sinhalese politicians
Sri Lanka People's Freedom Alliance politicians
Sri Lanka Podujana Peramuna politicians
1980 births